Los Angeles Southwest College (LASC) is a public community college in the unincorporated area of West Athens, California in Los Angeles County, California. It is part of the Los Angeles Community College District and its service area includes Inglewood, Hawthorne, Gardena, Unincorporated Westmont, and West Athens.

History
Los Angeles Southwest College was established in 1967, two years after the Watts riots, in response to complaints of both officials and citizens that not enough was being done to educate the area's mostly African American population. The college, located at the intersection of Western Avenue and Imperial Highway, is the only community college in South Central Los Angeles.

LASC has secured over $500 million of bonds to complete its master facilities master plan by 2025.  As a "green campus", LASC has a college-wide recycling program and will have the majority of its building meeting some level of LEED standard.

Notable alumni
 Larry Brown, Dallas Cowboys and Oakland Raiders cornerback, Super Bowl XXX MVP
 Othyus Jeffers, former NBA player
 Ivan Johnson, former NBA power forward
 Sam Johnson, former NFL player
 Isaac Larian, founder and CEO of MGA Entertainment
 Curtis Millage, former professional basketball player
 Chris Mims, former NFL player
 Dayvon Ross, former NFL player

See also
 West Athens, California

References

External links
 Official website

Educational institutions established in 1967
Schools accredited by the Western Association of Schools and Colleges
Two-year colleges in the United States
California Community Colleges